Revolute may mean:
in botany, having the edges rolled down or back; see Glossary of botanical terms#R
Revolute leaf
in engineering, being able to rotate but not slide (of a joint)
 "Revolute", a song by 12 Rods from Gay?

See also 
 Revolut